The Svatava is a river in the Czech Republic and Germany. It is a left tributary of the Ohře.

Course
From its source south of Schöneck (Germany), in the crest regions of the Saxon Vogtland, the river is called Zwotawasser. After its merge with the river Wolfsbach, it is called Zwotau until the Czech border.

The Svatava's river valley then runs east between Wolfsberg (771 m) in the north and the Hoher Brand. Along its course range the villages Oberzwota, Zechenbach, Zwota and the border town of Klingenthal, where the Brunndöbra joins it. After that it continues its flow in a steep valley of the Ore Mountains. Along the Svatava lies the town of Kraslice, after that its course comes through Anenské Valley, meandering through Oloví and Josefov into the coal-mining area of the Sokolov Basin. Along the underflow of the Svatava, there is the market town of Svatava. After , the Svatava joins the Ohře in Sokolov.

Tributaries
Glasbach (l), Zwota
Döbra (l), Klingenthal
Grenzbach (l),
Bublavský Stream (l), Kraslice
Stříbrný Stream (l), Kraslice
Rotava (l), Anenské Valley

Special features
The Zwotatal represents an important traffic route through the south-west of the Ore Mountains. Besides more than one Bundesstraße, there is a railway connection from Zwickau via Zwotental, Klingenthal and Kraslice alongside the river towards Sokolov.

See also
List of rivers of Saxony
List of rivers of the Czech Republic

References

Rivers of Saxony
Rivers of the Karlovy Vary Region
Vogtland
International rivers of Europe
Rivers of Germany
Czech Republic–Germany border
Border rivers